Andrew James Noble  is a British diplomat who is currently the British Ambassador to Romania. He previously served as the British Ambassador to Algeria. He joined the Foreign and Commonwealth Office (FCO) in 1982, and has also worked in Germany, South Africa and Greece.

Career 
Noble joined the FCO in 1982. From 1983 to 1986 he served as the third and later second political secretary in Bucharest. He subsequently served as the deputy head of mission in Berlin.

In June 2014 he took over from Martyn Roper as the Ambassador to Algeria. During his tenure as Ambassador, he was criticised after he was photographed wearing shorts while visiting a mosque.

He was named the Ambassador to Romania in succession to Paul Brummell and took up his appointment in August 2018. Noble pressured the authorities over a dispute over Bucharest Pride 2021, enabling the march to take place along its traditional route. He commented, "A country where minorities don't have rights is a country full of fear".

Personal life 
He is married to Helen Natalie Pugh Noble and has four children. He has adopted a bear from a Romanian bear sanctuary.

References 

Living people
Ambassadors of the United Kingdom to Algeria
Ambassadors of the United Kingdom to Romania
Year of birth missing (living people)